HAGL may refer to:

 Height above ground level
 Hoang Anh Gia Lai Group, a Vietnamese company
 Hoàng Anh Gia Lai F.C., an association football club